Anthony Huguet (born 22 January 1973) is an Australian alpine skier. He competed in two events at the 1994 Winter Olympics.

References

External links
 

1973 births
Living people
Australian male alpine skiers
Olympic alpine skiers of Australia
Alpine skiers at the 1994 Winter Olympics
Sportspeople from Annecy